James Nusser (May 3, 1905 – June 8, 1979) was an American film and television actor. He was known for playing the recurring role of town drunk Louis Pheeters in the American western television series Gunsmoke from 1956 to 1970. 

Buzzer was born in Cleveland, Ohio. He appeared in television programs including The Wild Wild West, Perry Mason, The Fugitive, Mannix, The Virginian, Cannon, I Married Joan, Sergeant Preston of the Yukon and Bat Masterson, and also in films such as Where Were You When the Lights Went Out?, Hell Canyon Outlaws, One Girl's Confession, Hail, Hero!, Bonzo Goes to College, Cahill U.S. Marshal, It Should Happen to You and Hillbillys in a Haunted House.

Nusser died in June 1979 in Los Angeles, California, at the age of 74. He was buried in Valhalla Memorial Park Cemetery.

References

External links 

Rotten Tomatoes profile

1905 births
1979 deaths
People from Cleveland
Male actors from Ohio
American male film actors
American male television actors
20th-century American male actors
Western (genre) television actors
Burials at Valhalla Memorial Park Cemetery